"Highway Song" is a 1979 hit song recorded by the American southern rock Blackfoot. It reached #26 on the Billboard Hot 100. The song was recorded in the key of E minor with no key changes throughout. While the single version maintains its tempo throughout, the album version increases its speed at the close of the lyrical portion through the song's ending.

Weekly charts

References

1979 singles
1979 songs